Märt Rosenthal (born 15 March 1999) is an Estonian professional basketball player for Tartu Ülikool of the Estonian–Latvian Basketball League and the Korvpalli Meistriliiga (KML). He also represents the Estonian national team. Standing at 1.93 m (6 ft 4 in), he plays at the shooting guard position.

National team career
Rosenthal made his debut for the Estonian national team on 21 February 2021, in a EuroBasket 2022 qualifier against Russia, scoring 4 points in a 52–75 defeat.

References

External links
 Märt Rosenthal at fiba.com
 Märt Rosenthal at basket.ee 

1999 births
Living people
Sportspeople from Tartu
Estonian men's basketball players
Shooting guards
Korvpalli Meistriliiga players
University of Tartu basketball team players
KK Pärnu players
21st-century Estonian people